Jayasimha is a 1955 Indian Telugu-language swashbuckler film, written by Samudrala Jr. and produced by N. T. Rama Rao and his brother N. Trivikrama Rao for their production company National Art Theatres. Directed by D. Yoganand, the film features Rama Rao playing the eponymous protagonist along with Anjali Devi and Waheeda Rehman (making her debut as an actress in Indian cinema) in the lead roles, supported by an ensemble cast of S. V. Ranga Rao, Kanta Rao, Gummadi, Relangi and Rajanala Kaleswara Rao.

Inspired from the Telugu novel Veera Pooja, the film tells the story of Jayasimha (played by Rama Rao), the crown prince of Malawa kingdom who escapes assassination attempts from his uncle Rudrasimha (Ranga Rao), who wishes to ascend the throne as the next king. Jayasimha leaves Malawa assuming a new identity and leads the life of a soldier in Magadha kingdom, falling in love with its princess Padmini (Waheeda) and befriending Kalindi (Anjali Devi), the daughter of an old disabled general Ranadheer (Gummadi). The rest of the film focuses on the aftermath of Rudrasimha finding out Jayasimha's new life in Magadha and seeking his life.

D. V. S. Raju, who assisted Rama Rao during the production of Pichi Pullayya (1953) and Thodu Dongalu, joined the film's crew as an associate producer. T. V. Raju composed the film's soundtrack and score; M. A. Rehman was signed as the cinematographer and G. D. Joshi edited the film. Jayasimha principal photography was conducted at sets erected by Thota at Vijaya Vauhini Studios, Madras (now Chennai).

Jayasimha was released theatrically on 21 October 1955, cashing in on the Vijayadashami festival holidays. Upon release, the film was a commercial success, completing a 100-day run in 6 centres, 169-day run in Vijayawada and Guntur, and a 175-day run in Bangalore. It was later dubbed into Tamil in the same year, with the title Jayasimman.

Plot 
Amarasimha, the ruler of Malawa kingdom, calls his brother Rudrasimha and his wife Durgadevi. In his dying moments, Amarasimha requests the couple to raise his son Jayasimha and make him the king after he attains suitable age. Durgadevi raises Jayasimha and her biological son Vijayasimha with equal love and attention. As Jayasimha becomes a major, Durgadevi and Vijayasimha announce the coronation ceremony. However, Rudrasimha wants to ascend the throne, and supported by the evil commander-in-chief Chandasena, sends a group of assassins to kill Jayasimha. Jayasimha and Vijayasimha overpower them, but are unable to find the person behind the attack. Jayasimha later learns about Rudrasimha's plans, but decides to spare his life for Durgadevi. Dejected, Jayasimha leaves the kingdom forever, making Rudrasimha the king.

As Durgadevi and Vijayasimha search for Jayasimha, Rudrasimha too joins them as he does not want any possibility of obstacles for his rule. Meanwhile, Jayasimha reaches the forests of the Magadha kingdom where its princess Padmini is found kidnapped by a group of dacoits. Jayasimha saves her from them, but refuses to accept her hospitality and leaves. Padmini falls in love with him and continues to search for him. In his attempts to find a job, Jayasimha befriends Budhimathi, the adopted son of an old disabled general Ranadheer and his daughter Kalindi. He introduces himself with the alias Bhavani to them, and looks for opportunities in the Magadha army. After being rejected and insulted by the ministers, Padmini notices Jayasimha and sends a ring through one of her friends, asking him to use it for gaining an army job.

Jayasimha gains the job, and saves the king Raghuveer in an attack from the enemies. Raghuveer is impressed with Jayasimha's skills and promotes him. Later, Padmini and Jayasimha begin to spend more time together, and develop feelings for each other. This angers Mahaveer, the commander-in-chief of Magadha, who too has an interest in Padmini. At the same time, Kalindi proposes to Jayasimha, which puts him in a dilemma. Meanwhile, Rudrasimha learns about the adventures of Bhavani in Magadha, and sends Chandasena to confirm if Bhavani is Jayasimha. Chandasena reaches Magadha, identifies Bhavani and Jayasimha, and plots with Mahaveer. Chandasena and Mahaveer kidnap Jayasimha and Padmini, and take them to an isolated place. Mahaveer plans to forcibly marry Padmini after finishing off Jayasimha. Kalindi, who was following the duo all this time, acts as a mad women before the army and infiltrates their camp.

Knowing that Jayasimha considers her as his sister from god, Kalindi resolves to save him, and is fatally injured in the process. She saves Jayasimha and Padmini, and dies in her father Ranadheer's arms. A grief-stricken Jayasimha decides to fight back, and defeats Mahaveer with the aid of Budhimathi and Ranadheer. Mahaveer dies in the process and Jayasimha reveals his true identity to Padmini. With Raghuveer's support, Jayasimha returns to Malawa to challenge Rudrasimha. However, at the last moment, Jayasimha wishes to let go as he is unable to fight his love for Rudrasimha, whom he considered his father figure. Vijayasimha, who learned about attempts on Jayasimha's life, fatally injures Rudrasimha. In his dying moments, a shocked Rudrasimha feels remorseful and apologies to both Jayasimha and Vijayasimha. The film ends with Jayasimha becoming the combined ruler of Malawa and Magadha kingdoms.

Cast  
Anjali Devi as Kalindi
N. T. Rama Rao as Jayasimha / Bhavani 
S. V. Ranga Rao as Rudrasimha
Relangi as Budhimathi
Gummadi as Ranadheer
Kanta Rao as Vijayasimha
Rajanala Kaleswara Rao as Mahaveer
K. V. S. Sarma as Chandasena
Dr. Kamaraju as Raghuveer
Vangara Venkata Subbaiah as Prime Minister of Magadha kingdom
Rushyendramani as Madhavi
Waheeda Rehman as Padmini
Valluri Balakrishna as a soldier in Magadha army
Padmanabham as a soldier in Magadha army

Production

N. T. Rama Rao was depressed because of the commercial failure of his previous film Thodu Dongalu (1954), which he produced along with his brother N. Trivikrama Rao and Atluri Pundarikakshayya. The failure prompted Rama Rao to contemplate quitting film production, until Trivikrama Rao and Pundarikakshayya convinced him to try making a swashbuckler film rooted in folklore. The financial success of Pathala Bhairavi (1951), Chandirani (1953) and Rechukka (1954)all starring Rama Rao in the lead role and set in the same genrefurther influenced their decision. Most of the principal crew of Thodu Dongalu, including its director D. Yoganand and writer Samudrala Jr., were retained for this film. Rama Rao advised Samudrala Jr. to loosely adapt the novel Veera Pooja. However, the same was not acknowledged in the film's credits.

The film was titled Jayasimha and was produced for Rama Rao's production company National Art Theatre. While Rama Rao decided to play the eponymous protagonist, Anjali Devi and Waheeda Rehman were cast as the female leads Kalindi and Padmini respectively. Jayasimha was Waheeda's debut as an actress, after her cameo appearances in Kanyadanam (1954) and Rojulu Marayi (1955); she was trained by Pundarikakshayya himself and her lines were dubbed by Sowcar Janaki. For the role of Vijayasimha, Jayasimha's brother, the makers approached Akkineni Nageswara Rao who could not accept the offer because of scheduling conflicts. Jaggayya was considered, but Gummadi (who was cast as Ranadheer, Kalindi's father) recommended Kanta Rao for the role. Rama Rao agreed, and this was Kanta Rao's second collaboration with the former after Vaddante Dabbu (1954). S. V. Ranga Rao, Rajanala Kaleswara Rao and Relangi were cast in key supporting roles. Anjali Devi was given the top billing in the film's opening credits and the song books, and was succeeded by Rama Rao and Ranga Rao.

D. V. S. Raju, who assisted Rama Rao during the production of Pichi Pullayya (1953) and Thodu Dongalu, joined the film's crew as an associate producer. M. A. Rehman was signed as the cinematographer and G. D. Joshi edited the film. Jayasimha was shot in sets erected by Thota at Vijaya Vauhini Studios, Madras (now Chennai). Principal photography commenced on 19 January 1955 with a sequence filmed on Rama Rao and Relangi at Vauhini Studios, Madras. 'Stunt' Somu choreographed the action sequences. Kuchala Kumari and Rita composed the choreography for the dance sequences. The post-production activities were carried out at Vijaya Laboratories in Madras.

Music

T. V. Raju composed the film's soundtrack and score, with lyrics written by Samudrala Jr., which was marketed by HMV Records. Chellapilla Satyam, who was known as 'Dholak' Satyam back then, assisted Raju during the composition of the songs. A. Krishnan was the film's audiographer, assisted by A. R. Swaminathan, C. Radhababu and V. Govinda Rao. On Satyam's advice, Raju decided to look for inspiration in Hindustani classical music. For the song "Eenati Eehayi", Raju took inspiration from Ghulam Mohammed composition "Zindagi Denewale Sun" for Dil-E-Nadaan (1953). Similarly, for the pallavi of the song "Manasaina Cheli Pilupu", Raju used the tune of "Chori Chori Aag Se" composed by Shyam Sundar for Dholak (1951). Raju deviated from the tune of the originals, however, while composing the charanam for these songs. Another song "Are Nee Sagamapa" was adapted from a Hindi language composition of the same name written by Alla Rakha for Sabak (1950).

The song "Nadireyi Gadichene", filmed on Waheeda, was composed as a javali using the Begada raga. The duet "Madiloni Madhurabhavam", filmed on Rama Rao and Waheeda, was composed using the Mohanam raga. Raju composed the song "Nadiyeti Painadachu" in a Burra katha format which was well received by the critics. The soundtrack, consisting of 12 songs, was released on 31 December 1955 and received positive reviews. The song "Jaya Jaya Sri Rama" particularly gained popularity during the film's release and was played regularly in temples dedicated to Rama in Andhra Pradesh.

Release and reception
Jayasimha was released theatrically on 21 October 1955, cashing in on the Vijayadashami festival holidays. National Art Theatre released the film on their own across Andhra Pradesh, while the distribution rights for Nizam, Ceeded and Mysore regions were acquired by All India Talkie Distributors. Upon release, the film was a commercial success, completing a 100-day run in 6 centres, 169-day run in Vijayawada and Guntur, and a 175-day run in Bangalore. Jayasimha was later dubbed into Tamil the same year with the title Jayasimman.

Notes

References

External links

1955 films
1950s historical fantasy films
1950s Telugu-language films
Indian black-and-white films
Indian historical fantasy films
Films about royalty
Films scored by T. V. Raju
Films directed by D. Yoganand